Raghunathpur is a Village Development Committee  (consisting Pachayanpur, Inarwa and ) in Bara District in the Narayani Zone of south-eastern Nepal. At the time of the 1991 Nepal census it had a population of 3,037 persons residing in 471 individual households.

References

External links
UN map of the municipalities of Bara District

Populated places in Bara District